Volunteer is an album by punk band Sham 69, released in 1988 (see 1988 in music).

Track listing
All songs by Jimmy Pursey and Dave Parsons
 "Outside the Warehouse" - 4:13
 "Wicked Tease" - 2:49
 "Wallpaper" - 3:48
 "Mr. Know It All" - 3:05
 "As Black as Sheep" - 3:49
 "How the West Was Won" - 3:32
 "That Was the Day" - 3:41
 "Rip and Tear" - 3:13
 "Bastard Club" - 4:53
 "Volunteer" - 3:19

Personnel
Jimmy Pursey - vocals, producer
Dave Guy Parsons - guitar, producer
Andy Prince - bass
Ian Whitehead - drums
Tony Hardie-Bick - keyboards
Linda Paganelli - saxophone
John Palmer - engineer
Christopher Marc Potter - mixing

References

1988 albums
Sham 69 albums
Legacy Recordings albums